The Szechuan vole (Volemys millicens) is a species of rodent in the family Cricetidae.
It is found only in northwestern Sichuan, China. It is one of two species in the genus Volemys along with Marie's vole (Volemys musseri).

Range
In northwestern Sichuan, China, Volemys millicens is found in the Wolong National Nature Reserve, and likely also occurs in Wenchuan Caopo, Heishuihe, Fengtongzhai, Anzihe, and Longhixihongkou Nature Reserves.

References

Musser, G. G. and M. D. Carleton. 2005. Superfamily Muroidea. pp. 894–1531 in Mammal Species of the World a Taxonomic and Geographic Reference. D. E. Wilson and D. M. Reeder eds. Johns Hopkins University Press, Baltimore.

Volemys
Mammals described in 1911
Taxa named by Oldfield Thomas
Rodents of China
Taxonomy articles created by Polbot
Endemic fauna of Sichuan